Social Studies is a 1981 bestselling collection of comedic essays by writer Fran Lebowitz.

Social Studies was released in a 1994 compilation entitled The Fran Lebowitz Reader along with Lebowitz's other bestseller Metropolitan Life.

References

1981 non-fiction books
English-language books
Comedy books
American essay collections
Jewish comedy and humor
Books about New York City
Random House books
Books by Fran Lebowitz